Mohamed Eslan Awad (born ) is a former Egyptian male volleyball player. He was included in the Egypt men's national volleyball team that finished 11th at the 2000 Summer Olympics in Sydney, Australia.

See also
 Egypt at the 2000 Summer Olympics

References

External links
 profile at sports-reference.com

1976 births
Living people
Egyptian men's volleyball players
Place of birth missing (living people)
Volleyball players at the 2000 Summer Olympics
Olympic volleyball players of Egypt